King is an interim Australian bioregion which includes King Island, the Hunter Islands, Robbins Island, and the north-western tip of Tasmania.

King Island, located at the western entrance to Bass Strait, is home to a range of native plants and animals, some of which are under threat of extinction. Plant species under threat include, but are not restricted to, native orchids and ferns, whilst the animal species include the locally endemic threatened birds, the King Island brown thornbill (Acanthiza pusilla archibaldi) and King Island scrubtit (Acanthornis magna greeniana).

See also

 Ecoregions in Australia
 Interim Biogeographic Regionalisation for Australia
 Regions of Tasmania

References

Further reading
 

King Island
IBRA regions
King Island (Tasmania)
Flora of Tasmania